Abid Azad (16 November 1952 – 22 March 2005)  was an eminent Bangladeshi poet, critic and literary editor. Azad was the author of 19 books of poetry including Ghaser Ghatana (1976), Amar Mon Kemon Kore (1980), Banotaruder Marma (1982), and Shiter Rachanabali (1983).

References 

Bangladeshi male poets
1952 births
2005 deaths
20th-century poets
20th-century male writers